The Fish River is a river in the Northern Territory of Australia. It is a tributary of the Daly River which ultimately flows into the Joseph Bonaparte Gulf which is part of the Timor Sea.

Its catchment covers an area of 1,748.15 km2. None of the land within the river's watershed, which is covered by woodlands and melaleuca forest, has been cleared of its vegetation.

See also

References 

Rivers of the Northern Territory